Bruno's Dream is a novel by Iris Murdoch. Published in 1969, it was her twelfth novel.

Plot
Set in London, the novel tells the story of a dying man called Bruno and his family. Narrated in the third person that allows for multiple character perspectives it follows Bruno, Bruno's son Miles, Miles' wife Diana and her sister Lisa, Bruno's son-in-law Danby, Bruno's nurse Adelaide, Nigel (the messianic figure consistently found in Murdoch's novels) and Nigel's twin brother, Will. The novel ends with all the different people, other than Nigel, coupling up.

Couples:
Miles and Parvati (1st wife), Miles and Diana (2nd wife), Miles and Lisa (Diana's sister) they love each other but never get together.
Danby and Gwen (1st wife and Bruno's daughter), Danby and Adelaide (his maid/mistress), Danby and Diana- they go dancing once and he proposes an affair, but it doesn't come to fruition. Danby and Lisa (they end up together at the end of the novel.
Bruno and Janie (his wife), Bruno and Maureen (his mistress).
Will and Adelaide (cousins)
In the end the couples are Miles and Diana, Danby and Lisa, Bruno and Diana, and Will and Adelaide.

Awards and nominations
Bruno's Dream was shortlisted for the 1970 Booker Prize.

Reception
The critic Harold Bloom listed Bruno's Dream in his The Western Canon (1994) as one of the books in his conception of artistic works that have been important and influential in Western culture. The writer A. N. Wilson described Bruno's Dream as one of the most "distinctive and successful" novels Murdoch wrote in the 1960s.

References

1969 British novels
Novels by Iris Murdoch
Novels set in London
Chatto & Windus books